The Professional Development League is a system of youth football leagues that are managed, organised and controlled by the Premier League or by the Football League. It was introduced by the Football Association via the Elite Player Performance Plan in 2012.

The system was introduced in early 2012 and was active for the first time during the 2012–13 season. It is a successor to the Premier Reserve League, Premier Academy League and Football Combination. The Football League Youth Alliance makes up League 2 of the under-18 system. The system covers the under-18, under-21 and under-23 age groups.

Previously, clubs participating in the Premier Reserve League (the highest level of reserve football in England) were removed from the competition if their first team in the Premier League were relegated and replaced with a promoted team. Under the Professional Development League system, Premier League reserves teams' league status is not directly linked to the first team's Premier League status. Instead, there are three different Professional Development Leagues at each age-group level and clubs in the top four tiers of the English football league system are placed in the system based on the assessment of their academy for the Elite Player Performance Plan (EPPP).

Under-21 level

Premier League 2

From 2012 to 2016, EPPP Category 1 academies' most senior youth league was an under-21 league known as the U21 Premier League, with four over-age outfield players being permitted to play. From the 2016–17 season onwards, the competition is known as the Premier League 2 and the age limit increased from under-21 to under-23. This change was reverted ahead of the 2022–23 season, with the competition once again being restricted to under-21 players. In order to help with the transition, teams were allowed up to five over-age outfield players, up from three, and one over-age goalkeeper.

The competition is split into two divisions, with promotion and relegation between each. Clubs in Premier League 2 can also compete in the Premier League Cup, the Premier League International Cup and the EFL Trophy, which is restricted to under-21 players.

Champions (Division 1)

Champions (Division 2)

Professional Development League

The senior youth age range for EPPP Category 2 academies is the Professional Development League. The competition is split into two regional divisions, with the overall champion determined after an end of season play-off series.

Champions

Under-18 level

Division 1

An under-18 league for EPPP Category 1 academies was formed alongside the formation of the Professional Development League in 2012. Known as the U18 Premier League, the competition is split into two regional divisions. The two winners of each division contest the final to determine the overall champions. Winners of the top division qualify for the UEFA Youth League.

Champions

2022–23 teams

Division 2

The junior youth age range for EPPP Category 2 academies is the U18 Professional Development League. The competition is split into two regional divisions, with the overall champion determined after an end of season play-off series.

Champions

References 

 
Premier League
Youth football leagues in England
Reserve football leagues in England